Dorylomorpha xanthopus is a species of fly in the family Pipunculidae. It is found in the Palearctic.

References

External links
Images representing  Dorylomorpha xanthopus at BOLD

Pipunculidae
Insects described in 1870
Muscomorph flies of Europe